Dudhwa railway station is a small junction railway station in Lakhimpur Kheri district, Uttar Pradesh. Its code is DDW. It is located in Dudhwa National Park, near Dudhwa village and Palia Kalan city. The station consists of one platform. The platform is not well sheltered. It lacks many facilities including water and sanitation.

References

Railway stations in Lakhimpur Kheri district
Lucknow NER railway division